Calloides is a genus of beetles in the family Cerambycidae, containing the following species:

 Calloides lorquini (Buquet, 1859)
 Calloides nobilis (Harris, 1837)
 Calloides regalis (Chevrolat, 1860)

References

Clytini
Beetles described in 1873